The Cernișoara is a left tributary of the river Cerna in Romania. It discharges into the Cerna in Lădești. It flows through the villages Cernișoara, Armășești, Groși, Modoia, Saioci, Ciocâltei and Roești.

References

Rivers of Romania
Rivers of Vâlcea County